Alessia Travaglini  (born 10 April 1988) is an Italian volleyball player, a member of the club P2P Givova Volley Baronissi.

Sporting achievements

Clubs 
Italian Championship:
  2007
Challenge Cup:
  2009

References

External links
 LegaVolleyFemminile profile
 Women.Volleybox profile

1988 births
Living people
Italian women's volleyball players